The South Is My Country (Portuguese: O Sul é o Meu País) is a separatist movement that claims the independence of Brazil's South Region, formed by the states of Paraná, Rio Grande do Sul, and Santa Catarina. The group claims the region is under-represented  by Brasília.

Context

During the Empire of Brazil, several separatist movements existed in the region. Among the main reasons for secession, the groups complained about high taxation of dry meat, the main export product of the region during the time. Armed conflict broke out in the Ragamuffin War, when Rio Grande do Sul unsuccessfully tried to gain independence. During the transition to the republic, federalist groups formed in the region, culminating in the Federalist Revolution.

In the context of the Brazilian República Velha (Old Republic), the so-called coffee with milk politics were in practice, favoring the states of São Paulo and Minas Gerais, the largest in terms of population and wealth - producers of coffee and dairy products, respectively. Rio Grande do Sul, among other states, joined the political opposition, forming the Liberal Alliance (Portuguese: Aliança Liberal) and launched Getúlio Vargas as candidate for president, who lost to Júlio Prestes. Vargas had almost 100% of the votes in Rio Grande do Sul. The Liberal Alliance refused to accept the results of the election, claiming that Prestes' victory was fraudulent. This led to a coup d'état known as Revolution of 1930, which made Getulio Vargas the new president, ending the Old Republic. After this, only two presidents linked to the states Paraná, Rio Grande do Sul, and Santa Catarina came to power democratically: Getúlio Vargas and João Goulart. Both presidents lost their mandates.

Movement

The movement arose during the Second Separatist Congress celebrated in 1992 at Laguna, founded by Adílcio Cadorin, freemason and former mayor of the city. It upholds the concept of self-determination of the peoples and does not constitute a political party, despite its founders being directly involved with politics.  The movement is headquartered in Curitiba and the President is Celso Deucher.

Its defenders allege that the states of Paraná, Rio Grande do Sul, and Santa Catarina have particular and distinct characteristics from the rest of Brazil, and thus they claim the right to political, economic, social and cultural self-determination, based on the expectation of self-sufficiency to direct better the resources of the state to attend to its regional peculiarities.

The official symbols of the movement includes three stars which represent Paraná, Rio Grande do Sul, and Santa Catarina.

Unofficial independence referendums

First edition 
On 1 October 2016, Plebisul - an unofficial referendum - was held. Voters were asked if they wanted to secede from Brazil, forming a new country with the three states. A total of 616,917 votes (which represents less than 3% the number of registered voters in these states) were counted according to the organizers of the ballot, 95% voting yes. They were hoping to reach up to a million votes throughout the three Brazilian states.

Second edition 

In 2017, a second edition of the referendum was announced, to be held on 7 October of the same year. The edition had an estimated cost of R$ 25,000. The participation target was set to the same as the previous referendum - 1 million voters.

In its second edition, the organizers also collected signatures for a popular initiative bill to hold an official referendum in 2018, with the same question and answer options as the informal popular referendum held so far.

Criticism 

Some academics claim that the movement bases its separatist claims in "natural differences", such as the region's climate, and that although these might create an "identity" for the region, the people and their culture are not much different from the rest of the country. Others claim there are cultural differences, such as in religion, literature, food, clothing, dances, music, etc. Some go as far as to say that Brazilians identify first with their home state, and only then as Brazilians. On the other hand, it is argued that it's impossible to identify each state's identity due to a shared "Brazilian" culture, which includes the Portuguese language, sport preferences, etc.

See also
Immigration to Brazil
Independence referendum
Juliana Republic
Lists of active separatist movements
Riograndense Republic
Southern Cone

References

External links 
 Official Blog

Independence movements
Separatism in Brazil
Secessionist organizations